Ludwigsdorf may refer to:

Ludwigsdorf, Lower Austria
Ludwigsdorf (Görlitz)
Ludwikowice Klodzkie, part of the Gross-Rosen concentration camp
the German name of Łodwigowo in Poland
the German name of Giulești and of Logig in Romania
the German name of Padina in Vojvodina, Serbia and Montenegro
a suburb of Windhoek